The 2016–17 Melbourne Stars season was the sixth in the club's history. Coached by Stephen Fleming and captained by David Hussey, they competed in the BBL's 2016–17 season.

Season

Ladder

Regular season

Semi-finals

Players

Season statistics

Home attendance

References

External links
 Official website of the Melbourne Stars
 Official website of the Big Bash League

Melbourne Stars seasons